Growtopia, commonly referred to as GT, is a massively multiplayer online sandbox video game where players can chat, farm, add friends, trade, build worlds, and engage in player versus player combat. The game was initially released on Android in November 2012, and has been released for iOS, Microsoft Windows, and OS X since then. In 2019, it was released on Nintendo Switch, PlayStation 4 and Xbox One. The servers for the console versions were shut down on July 30, 2020.

On February 28, 2017, a Ubisoft acquirement of Growtopia was announced and was completed during Ubisoft's 2016-17 fourth quarter, with the original developers being design and general advisors to the game's continued development. Growtopia utilizes the freemium model.

Gameplay

Gameplay
Growtopia is a 2D massively multiplayer online sandbox video game based around the idea that most of the in-game items can be grown from seeds of trees. The game has no end goals or 100% completion, however, there is an achievement system and quests to complete from non-player characters.

When a new player joins, they are sent to a private world called Tutorial, which teaches them the basics of the game by giving them quests through an item called the Growpedia. The player starts out with two basic tools: a fist for punching and breaking blocks and a wrench for editing block properties. Once they have finished the tutorial, they are sent to a world called Start so that they can learn more about the game.

Players can visit other people's worlds or create their own. When a player creates a new world, the world will be procedurally generated. Worlds in Growtopia have the same size, with the exception of some worlds created by the original developers (such as the world Tiny). Players can break and build blocks, get seeds or gems from blocks, plant seeds, and harvest trees. Players cannot interact with the world if it is locked by someone else.

Players can lock areas by using different sizes of locks: Small Lock, Big Lock, Huge Lock, and World Lock (there are also other types of locks such as Diamond Locks, which have the same function as World Locks). The game also contains types of locks that change certain aspects of how the world functions. When a player has locked an area, they can allow other people to interact with the area by giving them access through the lock. Locks also act as the main form of tradable currency.

Game moderation
The developers and moderators of the game are identified by the prefix (@) for moderators and (@) for developers before their usernames. The Growtopia crew is a team of people which is tasked with helping players, interacting with the community, gathering feedback, and enforcing the game's rules.

Seth Robinson and Mike Hommel, the creators and publishers of the original game, both have a account named @Seth and @Hamumu, respectively. Until mid-2019, when Ubisoft demoted Seth Robinson and Mike Hommel's account from developer to moderator for security reasons.

Development
Production of Growtopia started in 2012, when designer Seth Robinson made six mockup screenshots outlining the premise of the game of which he originally called Buildo, and sent it to Mike Hommel to entice him into helping with the project. The game's user interface started to take shape with Hommel's mockups. On October 22, 2012, Hommel uploaded a video to his YouTube channel showing the development of the game before its release.

During initial development, Robinson and Hommel brought in the help of composer Cory Mollenhour to produce Growtopias soundtrack.

After three months of development, the game was released on Android as a free beta on November 30, 2012, under the name Growtopia. They moved the game out of beta and released the full version on January 9, 2013. The game has been updated ever since. On February 28, 2017, Ubisoft announced an acquisition of Growtopia. The transaction was completed during Ubisoft's 2016-17 fourth quarter, under the terms that the original developers would continue being both design and general advisors to the game's continued development. A North American community management and moderation team was set up after Ubisoft's acquisition. They handed responsibility of the game's future development over to their Ubisoft Abu Dhabi team. The team has been working continuously on Growtopia ever since.

Release
The game can be played on multiple operating systems, including Microsoft Windows, OS X, iOS, and Android. The iOS version was released on January 11, 2013, after the initial release for Android on November 30, 2012. Following these mobile releases, the game was brought to computers; a Windows beta version was released on July 9, 2013, and a OS X version was released on July 27, 2013.

Growtopia was available for a period of time on the Nintendo Switch, PlayStation 4, and Xbox One from July 18, 2019, to July 30, 2020, before being discontinued in order to "allocate all resources back to support the Mobile and PC version". The decision to discontinue all console support was declared on April 27, 2020, and had followed from a previous announcement on January 19, 2020, which had notified the community that there would no longer be any major updates or annual events for the consoles platforms, as their team only had "limited resources available". An Ubisoft Abu Dhabi team member stated that since there were "many, many more players playing on Android, iOS, and PC", they were going to focus their resources back towards those platforms.

Reception

Growtopia received "mixed or average" reviews from critics according to review aggregator GameRankings.

Jay Is Games described the game as "simple and easy enough to work on the mobile platform (and be fun for kids), but with enough room for customization and socialization". 148Apps gave the game a 4/5, saying "the crafting mechanic is unique". Pocket Gamer's Peter Willington scored the game 6 out of 10, said he dislikes the crude menus, the UI is bland and cramped and hates the character design. TouchArcade wrote "With online games like this that take place in persistent worlds where everyone can interact, you’ll no doubt get some people trying to destroy things and generally make life tough for everyone else".

Notes

References

External links

2012 video games
Android (operating system) games
Adventure games
Early access video games
Indie video games
IOS games
MacOS games
Multiplayer video games
Nintendo Switch games
Open-world video games
PlayStation 4 games
Ubisoft games
Video games developed in Japan
Video games developed in the United Arab Emirates
Video games developed in the United States
Video games using procedural generation
Video games with cross-platform play
Windows games
Xbox One games
Robinson Technologies games